John de lo Cavo or de Capite was a Genoese pirate captain who entered the service of the Byzantine emperor Michael VIII Palaiologos and became lord of Anafi and Rhodes and megas doux of the Byzantine navy.

John de lo Cavo was a native of the small Aegean island of Anafi, but originated, like many of the corsairs in the employ of Michael VIII Palaiologos, from Genoa. His favourite hunting grounds were the seas around Euboea, although he is known to have extended his activities up to the Albanian coast and the region of Valona. 

Michael VIII launched a major effort to recover as many Aegean islands as possible from Latin rule, spearheaded by the megas doux Alexios Doukas Philanthropenos and another Italian renegade, Licario. De lo Cavo assisted by capturing his own native island, Anafi, from the Foscolo family that had held it. Michael VIII rewarded de lo Cavo with the lordship not only of Anafi, but also of Rhodes in ca. 1278, and was later raised, like Licario before him, to the rank of megas doux.

References

Sources
 
 
 

13th-century Byzantine people
13th-century Genoese people
Megaloi doukes
Byzantine mercenaries
Rulers of medieval Rhodes
People of medieval Greece
Privateers
Anafi
13th-century Greek people